Bartolomeo Giustiniani (1585–1653) was a Roman Catholic prelate who served as Bishop of Avellino e Frigento (1626–1653).

Biography
Bartolomeo Giustiniani was born in Chios, Greece on 15 November 1585.
On 9 February 1626, he was appointed during the papacy of Pope Urban VIII as Bishop of Avellino e Frigento.
On 22 February 1626, he was consecrated bishop by Antonio Marcello Barberini, Cardinal-Priest of Sant'Onofrio. 
He served as Bishop of Avellino e Frigento until his death on 24 April 1653.

References

External links and additional sources
 (for Chronology of Bishops) 
 (for Chronology of Bishops) 

17th-century Italian Roman Catholic bishops
Bishops appointed by Pope Urban VIII
1585 births
1683 deaths